The Füsinger Au (also Loiter Au,) is a river in the north of Schleswig-Holstein (Danish: Slesvig and Holsten respectively), Germany.

The Füsinger Au starts north of Idstedt (Danish: Isted), flows through the lakes Idstedter See and Langsee (Danish: Isted Sø and Langesø respectively), passes the village Loit (Danish: Løjt) and discharges into the Schlei (Danish: Slien) near Füsing (a district of Schaalby) (Danish: Fysing and Skålby).

See also 
 List of rivers of Schleswig-Holstein

Sources 
 flussinfo.net (in German)

Rivers of Schleswig-Holstein
0Füsinger Au
Rivers of Germany